Kennevic Asuncion (Chinese: 洪育雄; born March 21, 1980) is a male badminton player from the Philippines. He was born in Barbaza, Antique and is the son of former Philippine Badminton Team Coach Nelson Asuncion. He plays doubles with his sister Kennie Asuncion. 

The brother-sister team used to host a now defunct local badminton TV show, Badminton Extreme along with their father. The show was canceled due to the siblings' training for the 2008 Beijing Olympics. In its steed a magazine called Badminton Extreme was released.

He won several international tournaments including the Peru Open.

Career
Asuncion played at the 2006 Philippine Open Grand Prix Gold in mixed doubles. He beat Indonesia's Tri Kusharjanto and Minarti Timur 21-15, 21-10 before losing to Sudket Prapakamol and Saralee Thungthongkam of Thailand in the finals.

He played for the 2009 Sudirman Cup in Guangzhou, China; with the other Filipino players, including his sister Kennie. They showed good results in the said mixed team championships where they beat South Africa with a 1-4 score, before losing to Switzerland 4-1.

He is currently coaching the University of the Philippines and in the International School Manila' Badminton Team.

Achievements

BWF Grand Prix 
The BWF Grand Prix had two levels, the BWF Grand Prix and Grand Prix Gold. It was a series of badminton tournaments sanctioned by the Badminton World Federation (BWF) which was held from 2007 to 2017. The World Badminton Grand Prix sanctioned by International Badminton Federation (IBF) from 1983 to 2006.

Mixed doubles

  BWF Grand Prix Gold tournament
  BWF & IBF Grand Prix tournament

BWF International Challenge/Series (5 titles)
Mixed Doubles

 BWF International Challenge tournament
 BWF International Series tournament
 BWF Future Series tournament

References

External links
 BWF Player Profile

1980 births
Living people
Filipino male badminton players
Badminton players at the 1998 Asian Games
Badminton players at the 2002 Asian Games
Badminton players at the 2006 Asian Games
Asian Games competitors for the Philippines
Competitors at the 1997 Southeast Asian Games
Competitors at the 2001 Southeast Asian Games
Competitors at the 2003 Southeast Asian Games
Competitors at the 2005 Southeast Asian Games
Competitors at the 2007 Southeast Asian Games
Southeast Asian Games bronze medalists for the Philippines
Southeast Asian Games medalists in badminton